The Skåne Stags Rugby League Football Club was the first rugby league club formed in Sweden.

The sport of rugby league was introduced in Sweden in 2007, which led to the Sweden national rugby league team playing in international competitions.  The Swedish team initially struggled, but experienced an upturn in results with the founding of Skåne Stags and Kungsbaka Broncos in 2013.

The club played in the Pan Scandinavian league, with Copenhagen RLFC and Kungsbacka Broncos until 2014, when they were crowned champions.

In 2015 the Skåne Stags will play in the Sweden National Rugby League competition, known as the Sweden 'Impact Prowear' League due to sponsorship.
Skåne will join the Kungsbacka Broncos and two newly formed clubs, Sodertalje Storm and Stockholms Kungar.

Honours
Major titles

'''Other titles

References

External links

Rugby league teams
Rugby league in Sweden
Sports clubs in Sweden
Rugby clubs established in 2013
2013 establishments in Sweden
Euro XIII